Joseph Augustus Tole  (1846 – 13 December 1920) was a 19th-century New Zealand lawyer, politician, and Minister of Justice from 1884 to 1887.

Tole was born in 1846 in Wakefield, Yorkshire, England. He came to Auckland with his parents, John Tole and Margaret O'Halloran. In Auckland, he attended St Peter's School under the guidance of his teacher, Richard O'Sullivan. From St Peter's School, he knew John Sheehan. He then boarded at St John's College in Sydney. He matriculated in 1865 and graduated with a Bachelor of Arts in 1868. He received admission to the bar in 1871 and subsequently graduated with a Master of Laws. Following that, he returned to New Zealand, where he was admitted in 1872.

He married Eleanor Blanche Mary Lewis in Auckland on 4 November 1882.

He represented the Auckland electorate of Eden from 1876 general election (held on 6 January) until 1887. Following the 1884 general election, he became Minister of Justice in the Stout–Vogel Ministry.

In the 1887 election, when he contested the Newton electorate, the two other candidates were Edward Withy (a political novice who, after early retirement from business, had emigrated with his large family to Auckland in 1884) and Henry Thomas Garrett.  Tole and Garrett were liberal politicians, whilst Withy was a conservative. The liberal vote was split, and Tole, Withy and Garrett received 606, 701 and 170 votes, respectively, with Withy thus elected.

In 1893, he became Crown Prosecutor at Auckland and remained in that role until his death. He was among the inaugural New Zealand King's Counsel appointed in 1907. He had been ill for four months and was improving, but he died at his home in Remuera from heart failure on 13 December 1920.

Notes

References

1846 births
1920 deaths
New Zealand MPs for Auckland electorates
Members of the Cabinet of New Zealand
People educated at St Peter's College, Auckland
University of Sydney alumni
New Zealand Roman Catholics
English emigrants to New Zealand
Members of the New Zealand House of Representatives
New Zealand King's Counsel
People from Wakefield
Unsuccessful candidates in the 1887 New Zealand general election
19th-century New Zealand politicians
Justice ministers of New Zealand